Raipur is the capital city of the state of Chhattisgarh, India.

It may also refer to the following places:

India 
 Raipur district of Chhattisgarh
 Raipur (Lok Sabha constituency) in Chhattisgarh
 Raipur, Jabalpur, a satellite town near Jabalpur, Madhya Pradesh
 Raipur, Bhopal, a village in Bhopal district of Madhya Pradesh
 Raipur, Dahanu, a village in Maharshtra
 Raipur, Punjab, a village in Mansa district, Punjab
 Qila Raipur, a village in Ludhiana district, Punjab
 Raipur, Rajasthan, a village in Rajasthan
 Raipur, Uttarakhand, a census town in Dehradun district, Uttarakhand
 Raipur, Birbhum, a village in Birbhum district, West Bengal
 Raipur, Bankura, a census town in Bankura district, West Bengal
 Raipur, Bankura (community development block), an administrative division
 Raipur, Bankura (Vidhan Sabha constituency)
 Raipur, Purba Bardhaman, a census town in Purba Bardhaman district, West Bengal
 Raipur, Khiron, a village in Raebareli district, Uttar Pradesh
 Raipur, Rohaniya, a village in Raebareli district, Uttar Pradesh
 Raipur, Sareni, a village in Raebareli district, Uttar Pradesh
 Raipur, Akhand Nagar, a village in Sultanpur district, Uttar Pradesh

Elsewhere 
 Raipur, Nepal
 Raipur, Pakistan, a village in Jhang District, Punjab, Pakistan
 Raipur Upazila, an upazila of Lakshmipur District, Bangladesh

See also
 Rajpur (disambiguation)